Evgeny Donskoy was the defending champion, but chose to participate at the 2013 Odlum Brown Vancouver Open instead.

Pablo Carreño Busta won the title, defeating Albano Olivetti in the final, 6–4, 7–6(7–2).

Seeds

Draw

Finals

Top half

Bottom half

References
 Main Draw
 Qualifying Draw

Singles
Open Castilla y León singles
2013 ATP Challenger Tour